St Bega's Way is a 36-mile (58 km) walk through rural West Cumbria and the north west corner of the English Lake District. It is usually completed as a leisure walk over 3 days, but has also been used as the basis of a single day competitive Ultramarathon.

Background
The route: St Bees Priory *  -  Ennerdale Bridge  -   Borrowdale  -  Derwentwater - St Bega's Church * Bassenthwaite.

It is usual to walk in the easterly direction given with the prevailing wind on the back, but when run it is frequently done in the opposite, westerly, direction.

Although the route is named after St Bega it is entirely the invention of Rosalinde Downing, who described it in a small booklet.  Several commercial organisations offer guided or assisted vacations based on the walk.

References

External links 
 St Bega's Way official website.
 SBU35 the St Bega's Way Ultramarathon.
 The entry in the LDWA website.
 St Bega's Church, Bassenthwaite.

Long-distance footpaths in England
Footpaths in Cumbria